KZLG (95.9 FM, "Z 95.9") is a radio station broadcasting an adult contemporary format. Licensed to Mansura, Louisiana, United States, the station is currently owned by Cajun Broadcasting.  Its studios and transmitter are co-located in Moreauville.

References

External links

Radio stations in Louisiana
Mainstream adult contemporary radio stations in the United States